The MGM Grand Las Vegas is a hotel and casino located on the Las Vegas Strip in Paradise, Nevada. The MGM Grand is the largest single hotel in the world with 6,852 rooms. It is also the third-largest hotel complex in the world by number of rooms and second-largest hotel resort complex in the United States behind the combined The Venetian and The Palazzo. When it opened in 1993, the MGM Grand was the largest hotel complex in the world.

The property includes five outdoor pools, rivers, and waterfalls that cover , a  convention center, the MGM Grand Garden Arena, and the Grand Spa. It also houses numerous shops, night clubs, restaurants and the largest casino in Clark County, which occupies .

Located on the Tropicana – Las Vegas Boulevard intersection, pedestrians are not allowed to cross at street level. Instead, the MGM Grand is linked by overhead pedestrian bridges to its neighboring casinos: to the south across Tropicana Avenue, the Tropicana, and to the west across the Strip, New York-New York.

History

Marina Hotel and Casino (1975–1990)
The property was originally the site of the Golf Club Motel during the 1960s. In 1972, Tom Wiesner co-founded Southwest Securities Development Company, and later founded Wiesner Investment Company. In November 1973, Southwest Securities was planning the Airport Marina Hotel, to be built at the site of the 170-room Golf Club Motel, which was located near the Airport. Southwest Securities planned to renovate the motel structure and add a 14-story addition with 518 rooms. Fred Harvey Company would serve as the operator of the hotel, its restaurants, and other areas of the resort. Fred Harvey had previously opened hotels in other parts of the United States under the Airport Marina name. Southwest Securities also planned to construct a  casino that would operate separately from Fred Harvey.

The 700-room Marina, located at 3805 South Las Vegas Boulevard, was built by Wiesner Investment Company and was opened in 1975. In 1989, Wiesner and his partners sold the Marina to Kirk Kerkorian, who also bought the Tropicana Country Club, located behind the Marina and across Tropicana Avenue from the Tropicana and San Rémo hotels to obtain the site that would become the home of the MGM Grand. Kerkorian saw the Marina as a stable and solidly built resort, and decided not to destroy the hotel, but to build around it. During that time, the Marina was known as the MGM Marina Casino & Hotel.
 
The Marina closed on November 30, 1990, and ground was broken for the new casino hotel complex on October 7, 1991. The Marina hotel building still exists as the west wing of the main hotel building.

MGM Grand (1993–present)

When the latest MGM Grand opened on December 18, 1993, it was owned by MGM Grand Inc. At that time it had an extensive Wizard of Oz theme, including the green "Emerald City" color of the building and the decorative use of Wizard of Oz memorabilia. After entering the casino's main entrance, one would find themselves in the Oz Casino facing Emerald City. Dorothy, the Scarecrow, the Tin Man, and the Cowardly Lion were seen in front of the city. The Emerald City attraction featured an elaborate yellow brick road walk-through, complete with the cornfield, apple orchard, and haunted forest, as well as audio-animatronic figures of Dorothy, the Scarecrow, the Tin Man, the Cowardly Lion, and the Wicked Witch of the West. It would end at the door of the city, leading inside for a performance of "The Wizard's Secrets". When MGM Grand began its extensive refurbishment in 1996, the Oz Casino was the first to go. The Emerald City was completely demolished, and the Emerald City Gift Shop was moved to a new shopping section of the casino. The store remained open until early 2003.

When the MGM Grand opened, the intention was to create a destination hotel in the Las Vegas area by including the MGM Grand Adventures Theme Park behind the casino. The plan was to make the Las Vegas Strip more family-friendly by providing activities for those too young to linger inside the casino. The theme park performed poorly and did not reopen for the 2001 season. The site was redeveloped as a luxury condominium and hotel complex called The Signature at MGM Grand, which opened in 2006.

The resort's original entrance consisted of a giant lion head, made of fiberglass and blocky in appearance, with visitors entering through the lion's mouth. The lion was a cartoon-like version of MGM's logo, Leo the Lion.  The MGM Grand performed unusually poorly with Asian gamblers in its first years of existence; a study by the management found that many Chinese patrons found it bad luck to walk through the jaws of a lion and avoided the hotel as a result, part of why the entrance was renovated to remove this feature.

A monorail was built to connect MGM Grand to Bally's in 1995. The coming-out party for the monorail, on behalf of Bally's, consisted of showgirls and guys from Bally's famed show, Jubilee!, helping groups to the monorail. Characters from The Wizard of Oz greeted the groups on the MGM side. The track was later updated to become the southernmost section of the Las Vegas Monorail. The MGM Grand station was refurbished, the trains were replaced with Bombardier M-VI's, and the track was extended beyond the southern station to provide for track switching for the trains, as well as a starting point for a potential future southern extension to the monorail line.

In May 1996, MGM Grand Inc. announced a 30-month, four-phase renovation of the resort that would cost more than $250 million. The project would include replacing the property's lion entrance with a six-story gold lion structure. The first phase was to begin in June 1996 and would focus on the resort's restaurant, food court, and arcade area, with the addition of several new restaurants. The second phase would include the $15 million reconstruction of the lion entrance. Other changes would include a  convention center, to be built at a cost of $60 million; a $60 million retail and entertainment complex, including theme restaurants and nightclubs, to be built adjacent to the theme park; a new entrance, to be built along Koval Lane at a cost of $5 million, scheduled to begin in mid-1997; a $30 million renovation of 52 suites on the penthouse level; and $11 million to upgrade parts of the casino. The final phase would incorporate a $17 million entertainment theme at the resort's vehicle entrance on Tropicana Avenue. Other changes would include a $15 million renovation of the resort's Emerald City entertainment area, and an additional 2,000 parking spaces to be added at a cost of $13 million, for a new total of 11,000 spaces. Terrence Lanni, the chairman of MGM Grand Inc., said he wanted customers to "feel like guests coming to a premiere of one of the world's greatest movies. When we're completed, every aspect of this property will bespeak entertainment." The former restaurant, retail and arcade area was redesigned into the Studio Walk, an area resembling a Hollywood sound stage and featuring various restaurants and shops.

Demolition of the lion entrance began on May 13, 1997, and was expected to take two weeks, while the $250 million renovation project was expected to be finished by late 1998. The new facade was expected to cost $40 million to construct. In November 1997, the property installed 18 promotional and entertainment LED screens, including 15 outside the resort. Installation of the lion statue was underway in December 1997, with the addition of a 5,000-pound paw. Assembly of the 100,000-pound statue was expected to be finished later that month. The statues were made of bronze-finished fiberglass and accompanied the lion statue, along with LED screens and water fountains. Work on the statue and accompanying fountains was expected to be finished in February 1998. The resort's  conference center opened in April 1998. The conference center, a pool, and a spa were constructed on 15 acres of land previously occupied by a portion of the theme park and a parking lot.

 
In 2000, in an attempt to appeal to a more "mature" clientele, the hotel underwent a major renovation, and almost all traces of the Oz theme were removed. The theme is now more of the Art Deco era of classic Hollywood, and the hotel started billing itself as The City of Entertainment. More recently, the resort has used the phrase "Maximum Vegas", referring to the vast amount of activities MGM Grand offers its guests.

On April 26, 2000, MGM opened a new satellite registration/hotel check-in center at the airport. This was the first of its kind opened by a hotel company at any United States airport.  However, this airport check-in center closed in late 2013.

In 2005, MGM opened the West Wing, a renovation of the original Marina Hotel rooms.

In October 2011, MGM began a renovation in which all of its rooms and suites in the main tower were fully renovated, along with the casino floor and other public areas. This has provided the hotel with a more contemporary room design. The work was completed in September 2012. The renovations were also notable for making use of the emerging technology of dye-sensitized solar cells, collecting ambient indoor light to power motorized window blinds.

In June 2017, MGM Resorts International held a groundbreaking for a  expansion of the resort's convention conference center, for a total of  upon completion. The expanded conference center was topped off in January 2018, and was opened in January 2019. It was built at a cost of $130 million. At the time, the hotel had a 90 percent occupancy rate. That month, plans were announced by MGM Resorts to eventually redevelop the resort's entrance on Las Vegas Boulevard to provide easier pedestrian access. The redeveloped area would include restaurants and retail space accessible to pedestrians but was not expected to begin construction during 2019. MGM Resorts also planned to eventually redevelop the hotel's entrance on Tropicana Avenue in the years to come.

In January 2020, MGM Resorts announced that it would sell the resort to a joint venture consisting of MGM Growth Properties and The Blackstone Group. MGM Growth would own 50.1 percent of the joint venture, and Blackstone would own the remainder. The MGM Grand would be leased to MGM Resorts, which would continue to operate the resort. The deal was finalized a month later. Vici Properties bought MGM Growth in April 2022, and then bought out Blackstone's stake in the MGM Grand in January 2023.

On April 3, 2022, the resort hosted the 64th Annual Grammy Awards at the MGM Grand Garden Arena, marking the first time in history the Grammy Awards were held in Las Vegas. The resort also hosted other Grammy week events such as the MusiCares Person of the Year tribute to Joni Mitchell two days prior to the awards.

Film history
The MGM Grand was featured prominently in the 1996 boxing comedy The Great White Hype.
The MGM Grand was one of the casinos that Danny Ocean and his crew robbed in the 2001 film Ocean's Eleven. A staged title unification match between heavyweight boxing champions Lennox Lewis and Wladimir Klitschko was prominently featured in the film.
Clark Griswold (Chevy Chase) and his family play a game of Keno in the final scenes of Vegas Vacation alongside a character played by Sid Caesar. Keno is no longer offered at the casino. The exterior shot of the casino featured the former lion head entrance as well.
The MGM Grand's Wizard of Oz theme is referenced in the 1996 film Swingers as the friend of the waitress that Trent picks up works as "a Dorothy".
The MGM Grand, with its old entrance, was featured at the close of Casino as an example of the "new" Las Vegas.
The MGM Grand was featured in The Amazing Race 15 and The Amazing Race 24.
The MGM Grand is the site of the opening fight in Creed II between Adonis Creed and Danny "Stuntman" Wheeler.

Media
A parody of the MGM Grand was featured in the BMX video game Mat Hoffman's Pro BMX 2. Leo the Lion was replaced with dragons.

The MGM Grand was among many casinos at which the MIT Blackjack Team gambled in the book Bringing Down The House.

The MGM Grand is the home base of David Whele in Dominion.

The MGM Grand is well known as the prior location of rapper Tupac Shakur before his assassination. He was reported to be watching the Bruce Seldon vs. Mike Tyson boxing match with his collective members including Suge Knight. Shakur and his entourage got into a scuffle with Orlando Anderson, at one time the prime suspect in Shakur's murder.

Attractions

MGM Grand featured a glass-sided 5,000 square foot lion habitat inside the casino area, in which up to six lions were shown daily since 1999. A see-through tunnel ran through the habitat for close-up viewing, where the lions would frequently lounge on top of the glass, allowing visitors to walk under them. The lions were owned by Keith Evans, a trainer of exotic animals, and did not live at the habitat, but at his ranch  outside Las Vegas. The lion habitat closed permanently on January 31, 2012 as part of MGM Grand's renovation.
CSI: The Experience opened in the Studio Walk in September 2009. Here, guests try to solve one of three murder cases interactively, guided by touchscreen stations, cast member videos, and realistic recreated evidence. The first stop is a debriefing room where Gil Grissom introduces the "new recruits" to their assigned cases. After observing the evidence at the crime scene, visitors go to lab areas where they analyze the gathered evidence. They then present their findings in Grissom's office, answering a test based on their analysis of the evidence. Finally, visitors receive a case summary and a CSI diploma.
 TopGolf: Built on the former site of MGM Grand Adventures theme park, opened in May 2016.
 Level Up Las Vegas: Built on the former site of Rainforest Cafe, opened in December 2016.

Gaming
There are more than 2,500 machines for gaming as well as 139 poker and table games.

The slot machines at the MGM Grand range from 1¢ to $1,000 and include progressive slots, video poker, and multi-game machines. There is a special High Limit Slots area, featuring slot machines with payouts up to $500,000.

The race and sports book is a state of-the-art betting area that features thirty-six 60-inch plasma TVs, along with twenty-four 42-inch plasmas. Bets are offered on a range of sports including soccer, football, boxing, MMA and more. They are also the first room to offer what they call "SkyBoxes". These boxes can hold up to ten guests and come with beverage servers and complimentary food.

Hotel

The hotel rooms are located in several buildings including:
SKYLOFTS at MGM Grand, a AAA Five-Diamond, Forbes Five Star hotel, occupies the top two floors of the main building. The hotel has 51 lofts ranging from $2,000 to $10,000 per night and is a member of The Leading Hotels of the World.
The three The Signature at MGM Grand towers, each with 576 suites ranging from $170 to $599 per night (designed by Bergman Walls Associates).
The Mansion at MGM Grand with 29 villas reserved for VIP's, celebrities, and casino-invited guests ranging from $5,000 to $35,000 per night.

The Signature at MGM Grand
The Signature at MGM Grand is a condo hotel project by MGM Mirage and Turnberry Associates, who teamed up to build the three currently open Signature at the MGM Grand towers. Signature is located on the property where the MGM Grand Adventures Theme Park once stood. Each tower has its own private pool with cabanas as well as access to MGM Grand pools. Additional guest/owner amenities at The Signature include a Starbucks, meeting rooms, exercise room, bar and restaurant. Each tower is connected with walkways including moving walkways for the connection to the MGM Grand.

Entertainment venues
Brad Garrett's Comedy Club - featuring Brad Garrett and other comedians.
David Copperfield Theater - nightly shows by the illusionist
Hakkasan - restaurant and nightclub
Jabbawockeez Theater - features "Jreamz" by the eponymous dance group, and Beacher's Madhouse. Formerly home to the "Crazy Horse Paris."
Kà Theatre - home to Cirque du Soleil's production Kà. Formerly home to EFX.
MGM Grand Garden Arena - hosts major concerts and sporting events including the Latin Grammy Awards and Academy of Country Music Awards. It hosted the 64th Annual Grammy Awards on April 3, 2022.
Wet Republic Ultra Pool - dayclub

Restaurants

Joël Robuchon
L'Atelier de Joël Robuchon
Hakkasan
Emeril's
International Smoke [Ayesha Curry and Micheal Mina]
Craftsteak
Wolfgang Puck
Ambra
Morimoto
TAP Sports Bar
Rainforest Cafe (opened on December 18, 1997; closed on August 30, 2015)
China Tang
Nellie's Southern Kitchen

See also

 List of largest hotels in the world

References

External links

 

 
1993 establishments in Nevada
Casino hotels
Casinos completed in 1993
Casinos in the Las Vegas Valley
Darts venues
Hotel buildings completed in 1993
Hotels established in 1993
Resorts in the Las Vegas Valley
Skyscraper hotels in Paradise, Nevada
Zoos in Nevada